Anatole may refer to:

People
 Anatole (given name), a French masculine given name
 Anatole (dancer) (19th century), French ballet dancer
 Alex Anatole (born 1948), Russian-American Taoist priest
 Anatole France (born 1844), a French poet, journalist, and novelist

Fictional characters
 Anatole (mouse), a fictional mouse who is the title character in a series of children's books by Eve Titus and Paul Galdone
 Anatole (Jeeves character), a fictional character in the Jeeves stories who is the French chef of Aunt Dahlia
 Anatole Kuragin, a main character in Leo Tolstoy's novel War and Peace

Other uses
 Anatole (TV series), an animated children's television series
 Hilton Anatole, an American hotel

See also
 Anatol
 Anatoli (disambiguation)
 Anatoly
 Anatolius (disambiguation)